Alag is a 2006 Indian Hindi science fiction film starring Akshay Kapoor and Dia Mirza and directed by Ashu Trikha and produced by Subi Samuel. The protagonist is a man with extraordinary supernatural powers and with no hair on his entire body. Although, the film failed at the box office, Akshay Kapoor got good reviews for his performances in the film.
The film is an unofficial copy of the Hollywood movie Powder'' ( Directed by Victor Salva).

Plot
Widower Hemant Rastogi lives in scenic Mahabaleshwar, seemingly alone. One night he has a heart attack and passes away. When the police search his residence, they find Tejas, Hemant's only son, in the basement of the house. Tejas has spent his entire life in the basement, since he was extremely sensitive to sunlight, according to the doctor's, when Tejas' father took him there because his eyes turned red. The Police ask Purva Rana, head of P.R. Institute (an institute for the rehabilitation of young criminals), to look after Tejas, whose only experience of other people up until this point has been with his father and the books he provided for him. Tejas starts showing signs of Telekenesis, and is shunned by the other boys in the institute, resulting in the near-fatal accident of a security guard and the death of a fellow student. Tejas redeems himself in the eyes of Purva's wealthy father, Pushkar, when he is able to wake his wife, Gayatri Rana, from a coma-like condition. It looks like Tejas has been accepted into the Rana household, but he is subsequently harassed by doctors and scientists wishing to perform experiments on him. When Tejas and Pushkar both refuse to be part of these experiments, Tejas is abducted and held in a glass chamber by Dr. Richard Dyer, who wants to control his mind for his own benefit. Purva realises that Tejas has been abducted, and is fatally injured by Dr. Dyer in a rescue attempt. At the sight of this, Tejas' anger causes his powers to surge, shattering the glass cage, killing Dr. Dyer and electrocuting Purva. Tejas tries to bring her back to life but is unsuccessful. He goes back to his basement home with her memories with the darkness of guilt.

Cast
 Akshay Kapoor as Tejas Rastogi
 Dia Mirza as Purva Rana
 Mukesh Tiwari as Mr. Singh
 Sharat Saxena as Inspector
 Yatin Karyekar as Hemant Rastogi 
 Beena Banerjee as Gayatri Rana 
 Jayant Kripalani as Pushkar Rana
 Tom Alter as Dr. Richard Dyer
 Avtar Gill as Teacher

Guest Appearances 
Following celebrities appeared in the song "Sabse Judaa Sabse Alag":
Arjun Rampal
Shah Rukh Khan
Bobby Deol
Abhishek Bachchan
Preity Zinta
Sushmita Sen
Priyanka Chopra
Bipasha Basu
Lara Dutta
Karan Johar

Music
"Sabse Judaa Sabse" - Hemachandra, Kunal Ganjawala, Shaan, Gayatri Ganjawala
"Apun Kee Toli Bindhast Boli" - Kailash Kher, Shaan
"Leke Dil Lamha Tanhai Ka" - Kunal Ganjawala
"Hai Junu The Dj Suketu Mix" (Arranged by AKS) - Vasundhara Das, Shaan
"Hain Junun Jaga Abb Jine Kaa" - Shaan
"Sanjh Kee Pighalti Dhup Me Makhamali" - Ujjaini Mukherjee, Anand Sharma, Krishna
"The Soul Of Alag" - Ujjaini Mukherjee, Vedala Hemachandra

References

External links 

2006 films
2000s Hindi-language films
2000s Indian superhero films
Biopunk films
Cyberpunk films
2006 science fiction action films
Indian science fiction action films
Indian films with live action and animation
Films about telepresence
Films about technology
2006 computer-animated films
Indian action thriller films
Films scored by Aadesh Shrivastava
Indian science fiction thriller films
2006 action thriller films
Films directed by Ashu Trikha
Indian superhero films
Indian science fiction films
Hindi-language science fiction films
 this is based on true story